Erika Louise McLeod (now Harris; born 1981) is an alpine skier from New Zealand.

In  New Zealand at the 2006 Winter Olympics at Turin, she came 40th in the Slalom. She married real estate agent Mark Harris and as of 2020, she lives in Queenstown.

References

External links  
 
 

Living people
1981 births
New Zealand female alpine skiers
Olympic alpine skiers of New Zealand
Alpine skiers at the 2006 Winter Olympics